Stenoxia is a genus of moths of the family Erebidae. The genus was erected by George Hampson in 1926.

Species

References

Calpinae